Andrea White is an American novelist and civic leader. She is the wife of former Houston mayor Bill White.

Biography 
Andrea Ferguson was born in Baton Rouge, Louisiana, to Arthur John Ferguson (1917–2008), and Patsi (née Wells) Ferguson. The family moved in the 1950s from Louisiana to Houston, where she attended Memorial High School. She earned her undergraduate and law degrees from the University of Texas and became a partner in the law firm Locke Liddell where she remained until the birth of her second child, after which she was able to turn her writing hobby into a profession.

White's first book, Surviving Antarctica, a novel for teenage readers, was published in 2005. It was listed on the reading lists of several states, including the Texas Bluebonnet Award list. In 2006, she won the Golden Spur Children's Literature award given by the Texas State Reading Association. Her next book, Window Boy, was about a boy in a wheelchair who is a "basketball genius".

White and her husband have three children: Will, Elena, and Stephen.

In addition to writing, White serves as an active community volunteer. In partnership with the Houston Independent School District Board, White, and her husband started Expectation Graduation, a door-to-door initiative to reach out to Houston area youth who had not returned to school. She has also visited many schools such as St. Helen Catholic School in Pearland, Texas to answer questions about her books.

Gallery 
Pictures of Andrea White's visit to Krimmel Intermediate.

References 

Living people
21st-century American novelists
American women novelists
Spouses of Texas politicians
21st-century American women writers
1953 births